Caliphaea is a genus of broad-winged damselflies in the family Calopterygidae. There are about five described species in Caliphaea.

Species
These five species belong to the genus Caliphaea:
 Caliphaea angka Hämäläinen, 2003
 Caliphaea confusa Hagen in Selys, 1859
 Caliphaea consimilis McLachlan, 1894
 Caliphaea nitens Navás, 1934
 Caliphaea thailandica Asahina, 1976

References

Further reading

 
 
 

Calopterygidae
Articles created by Qbugbot